The Ghana national football team manager was officially established in 1958 by Ohene Djan, whom the Ohene Djan Sports stadium was named after. This happened after he was elected General Secretary of the Football Association by the clubs and the Ghana Amateur Football Association was officially founded.

Ohene Djan succeeded in securing the services of English Coach, George Ainsley who officially became Ghana's first national team coach. Since 1957 until date Ghana has had 33 different head coaches and three caretakers. C. K. Gyamfi is the most successful of these, leading the Black Stars to three Africa Cup of Nations titles – in 1963, 1965 and 1982 – making Gyamfi the joint most successful coach in the competition's history.

Fred Osam Duodu led the Black Stars to their 1978 Africa Cup of Nations title; Ratomir Dujković, Milovan Rajevac, and James Kwesi Appiah, have all led the Black Stars to World Cup qualification.

List of managers 
This is a complete list of Ghana national football team managers, who have coached the Ghana national football team. They are listed in chronological order, along with their nationality and tenure.

As of 13 February 2023

See also 

 Ghana national football team
 Ghana Football Association
 Charles Kumi Gyamfi

Notes

References 

 
Lists of national association football team managers